Garich may refer to:
 Garich, Kerman
 Garich, Sistan and Baluchestan